The 2001–02 season was Paris Saint-Germain's 32nd season in existence. PSG played their home league games at the Parc des Princes in Paris, registering an average attendance of 41,040 spectators per match. The club was presided by Laurent Perpère and the team was coached by Luis Fernández. Frédéric Déhu was the team captain.

Players

As of the 2001–02 season.

Squad

Left club during season

Competitions

Overview

Division 1

League table

Results summary

Results by round

Matches

Coupe de France

Coupe de la Ligue

Intertoto Cup

Second round

Third round

Semi-finals

Final

UEFA Cup

First round

Second round

Third round

Notes and references

Notes

References

External links

Official websites
PSG.FR - Site officiel du Paris Saint-Germain
Paris Saint-Germain - Ligue 1 
Paris Saint-Germain - UEFA.com

Paris Saint-Germain F.C. seasons
Paris Saint-Germain